Asra Kadisha (The Committee for the Preservation of Gravesites) is an organization for the preservation of Jewish cemeteries and gravesites throughout the world. The organization attempts to avoid desecration of ancient gravesites by preventing construction in their vicinity. It was established by Rabbi Yitzchok Zev Soloveitchik in 1959 as a response to excavations at Beit She'arim National Park, and has been headed for many years by Rabbi Dovid Shmidel.

According to Rabbi Shmidel, Rabbi Soloveitchik was asked by Rabbi Joel Teitelbaum to create Asra Kadisha.

See also
 Chevra kadisha

References 

Jewish organizations
Jewish organizations established in 1959
Jewish cemeteries
Cemetery vandalism and desecration